The Jama Mosque is a 17th-century congregational mosque located in the historic core of Agra, Uttar Pradesh. It was built by Jahanara Begum, Padshah Begum (First Lady) of the Mughal Empire, during the reign of her father, Mughal Emperor Shah Jahan. It is one of the largest mosques in India. Today it is still in use, serving as the principal mosque for the city of Agra. It stands opposite to the Agra Fort, and overlooks the Agra Fort Railway Station.

History

The Jama Masjid was commissioned by Jahanara Begum, after receiving permission from Shah Jahan. Its construction began in 1643 and was completed in 1648, coming at a cost of five lakh rupees. The mosque was part of several imperial reconstruction projects undertaken to improve Agra, the then-capital of the Mughal Empire. There was a spacious, octagonal Tripolia Chowk which existed between the Jama Masjid and the Delhi gate of the Agra Fort. This Tropolia was destroyed in order to create the Agra Fort Railway Station. The cloisters have engrailed arches supported on pillars. The main entrance is through the eastern side. The prayer chamber has a façade with a broad arched iwan in its centre and is adorned with slender turrets alternated with kiosks. Its dome is the largest and highest of the three domes crowning the sanctuary.

All the bulbous domes have inverted lotus and Kalash finials on the top and have narrow zigzag courses of white marble alternated by broad bands of red stone. There is a fountain with four kiosks in its corners in the centre of the courtyard. The interiors of the western wall have a beautiful mihrab and pulpit in white marble. The Persian inscription in white marble inlaid with the black stone on the archway of the central portal is in praise of Jahanara and Shah Jahan. The pristine beauty of the mosque must have been breathtaking as it was compared to the Beaty of the Baitul-Mamur, the fabulous mosque of rubies and pearls situated in the fourth sky. It is said that it was once surrounded by a marketplace called Tripolia set in an octagonal (Muthamman) Chowk that was built between the Delhi Gate and the Jami Masjid. But, it was later destroyed in 1871-73 A.D. to acquire space for laying down the railway tracks for the city.

It required 5,000 workers to finish.

Structure

The Jama Masjid of Agra is constructed of red sandstone with intricate white marble decorations. The walls and ceilings of the mosque are painted blue in colour. It is a huge mosque in the centre of Agra surrounded by a great bazaar.

The mosque itself stands on high platform to which ascent is made by a flight of 35 steps. It was designed to attract the eye of the faithful from afar and proclaim the glory of Islam. 

It has well-balanced proportions and a courtyard surrounded by cloisters on three of its sides and the prayer chamber on its western side. The cloisters have engrailed arches supported on pillars. All the bulbous domes have inverted lotus and kalash finials on the top and have narrow zigzag courses of white marble alternated by broad bands of red stone. There is a fountain with four kiosks in its corners in the centre of the courtyard. 

Along the wings of the main prayer wall are panels of beautifully inlaid sandstone, similar to those decorating the main gateway of the Taj Mahal. Still in use today, the mosque is one of the city's main landmarks, and serves as a useful reference point when exploring the crowded bazaars that sprawl from its base. These are laid out in a street plan that's barely altered since Mughal days.

Jami Masjid is beautifully decorated with paintings, inlaid stones, carvings, and glazed tiles. The building consists of pillared dalans (arcades), a beautiful chhajja, and the chhatri on the roof. The main iwan of the building is rather simple and contains a central arch with geometrical designs.

In Literature

An engraving of this mosque from a painting by William Purser appears in Fisher's Drawing Room Scrap Book, 1832 together with a poetical illustration by Letitia Elizabeth Landon.

References

External links

 Aerial View of the Jama Masjid
 http://www.agraindia.org.uk/monuments/jami-masjid-agra.html

Mughal mosques
History of Agra
Tourist attractions in Agra
Mosques in Agra
Religious buildings and structures completed in 1648
Archaeological monuments in Uttar Pradesh
1648 establishments in India
Agra